Colias interior, the pink-edged sulphur, is a species of North American butterfly in the family Pieridae.

Description
The wingspan for this butterfly is 39 to 66 mm.

Distribution
See range map.

Life cycle
There is one flight between June to August. The adult female lays eggs on blueberry plants.

Larval foods 
Vaccinium
Ericaceae

Adult foods
Aralia hispida
Pilosella aurantiaca

References

Pink-edged Sulphur, Butterflies of Canada

Butterflies of North America
interior
Butterflies described in 1862